Zaw Lin Htut (born 11 February 1964) is a Burmese politician and medical doctor who is an Amyotha Hluttaw MP for Mon State No. 9 constituency. He is a member of the National League for Democracy.

Early life and education 
Zaw Lin Htut was born on 11 February 1964 in Yangon, Myanmar. He graduated with MBBS from University of Medicine 1, Yangon. He is also a medical doctor and opened private clinic.

Political career
He is a member of the National League for Democracy. In the 2015 Myanmar general election, he was elected as an Amyotha Hluttaw MP, winning a majority of 51376 votes and elected representative from Mon State No. 9 parliamentary constituency.

References

Living people
1964 births
People from Yangon
Members of the House of Nationalities
National League for Democracy politicians
Burmese physicians
University of Medicine 1, Yangon alumni